A wrecking ball is a heavy steel ball suspended from a crane that is used for building demolition.

Wrecking ball may also refer to:

Music

Albums
Wrecking Ball (Bruce Springsteen album) (2012)
Wrecking Ball Tour, promotional tour 2012
"Wrecking Ball", a song by Springsteen originally written and performed during the 2009 Working on a Dream Tour, later released on the 2012 album
Wrecking Ball (Dead Confederate album) (2008)
Wrecking Ball (Emmylou Harris album) (1995)
Wreckin' Ball, an album by The Hub (1994)

Songs
"Wrecking Ball" (Neil Young song) (1989)
"Wrecking Ball" (Miley Cyrus song) (2013)
"Wrecking Ball", a song by 4Him from The Basics of Life
"Wrecking Ball", a song by Agent 51 from The Red & the Black (2003)
"Wrecking Ball", a song by Aubrey O'Day (2012)
"Wrecking Ball", a song by Chris Pureka from How I Learned to See in the Dark (2010)
"Wrecking Ball", a song by Creeper Lagoon from Take Back the Universe and Give Me Yesterday (2001)
"Wrecking Ball", a song by Crooked Fingers from Dignity and Shame (2005)
"Wrecking Ball", a song by Five Finger Death Punch from The Wrong Side of Heaven and the Righteous Side of Hell, Volume 2 (2013)
"Wrecking Ball", a song by Frankmusik from Do It in the AM (2011)
"Wrecking Ball", a song by Gama Bomb from The Terror Tapes (2013)
"Wrecking Ball", a song by Gary Allan from Living Hard (2007)
"Wrecking Ball", a song by Gillian Welch and David Rawlings from Soul Journey (2003)
"Wrecking Ball", a song by Grace Slick from Welcome to the Wrecking Ball! (1981)
"Wrecking Ball", a song by Halfcocked from Occupation: Rock Star (2000)
"Wrecking Ball", a song by Harvey Danger from Where Have All the Merrymakers Gone? (1997)
"Wrecking Ball", a song by Helix from Half-Alive (1998)
"Wrecking Ball", a song by Iko from Ludo Says Hi (2009)
"Wrecking Ball", a song by Interpol from Our Love to Admire (2007)
"Wrecking Ball", a song by Kaiser Chiefs as B-side track of the initial release of "I Predict a Riot" (2004)
"Wrecking Ball", a song by Joe Walsh from Analog Man (2012)
"Wrecking Ball", a song by Lifehouse from Smoke & Mirrors (2010)
"Wrecking Ball", a song by The Limousines from Hush (2013)
"Wrecking Ball", a song by Loaded from The Taking (2009)
"Wrecking Ball", a song by Mother Mother from O My Heart (2008)
"Wrecking Ball", a song by Much the Same from Survive (2006)
"Wrecking Ball", a song by Papa Vs Pretty from Heavy Harm' (2010)
"Wrecking Ball", a song by Sidewalk Prophets from Live Like That (2012)
"Wrecking Ball", a song by Slaid Cleaves
"Wrecking Ball", a song by Smile Empty Soul from 3's (2012)
"Wrecking Ball", a song by Terri Clark from Roots and Wings (2011)
"Wrecking Ball", a song by Viva Voce
"Wrecking Ball", a song by Vixen from Rev It Up (1990)
”Wrecking Ball”, a Song by Amelia Curran from Hunter, Hunter (2009)

Literature
Wrecking Ball Press, a UK small-press publisher
Wrecking Ball, a novel by Christiana Spens
Diary of a Wimpy Kid: Wrecking Ball, a children's novel by Jeff Kinney

Other uses
 Wrecking Ball (Overwatch), a fictional, playable character in the 2016 video game Overwatch
Frank Paul the Wrecking Ball, nickname for New Zealand professional rugby league player Frank-Paul Nu'uausala
Wrecking Ball Brewpub, business establishment in the historic Kriegshaber House in Inman Park, Atlanta
Wrecking Ball, a playable character from the video game series Skylanders

See also
Mark Recchi (born 1968), Canadian NHL ice hockey player, nicknamed "The Recchin' Ball"
Balls of Steel (disambiguation)